Shuangta is a town under the administration of Pulandian City in southern Liaoning province, China, located  northeast of downtown Pulandian and about  northeast of Dalian. , it has 9 villages under its administration.

See also 
 List of township-level divisions of Liaoning

References 

Towns in Liaoning